Mohammad Sadegh Taheri is an Iranian footballer who currently plays for Parseh Tehran in Azadegan League.

Club career
Taheri joined Tractor Sazi F.C. in 2010, after spending the previous two seasons at Damash Iranian F.C. in the Azadegan League.

 Assist Goals

References

Living people
Iranian footballers
Tractor S.C. players
Damash Iranian players
Damash Gilan players
1985 births
Association football midfielders